Face Stabber is the twenty-second studio album by American garage rock band Oh Sees, released on August 16, 2019 on Castle Face Records. The album expands on the progressive rock sound that the band explored on their two previous releases Orc and Smote Reverser.

Background
The band described the album's sound as "Soundcloud hip-hop reversed, a far flung nemesis of contemporary country and flaccid algorithmic pop-barf".

Track listing

Personnel
Credits adapted from AllMusic.

Oh Sees
John Dwyer – guitar, vocals, electronics, synthesizers, percussion, sax, samples, Mellotron, field recording
Tim Hellman – bass, percussion
Tomas Dolas – organ, synthesizers, Mellotron, percussion
Dan Rincon – drums, percussion
Paul Quattrone – drums, percussion

Additional musicians
Brigid Dawson – additional vocals 
Brad Caulkins – alto and tenor saxophone
Mario Ramirez, Enrique Tena Padilla, Eric Bauer – percussion

Technical personnel
Bernd K. Eisenschmidt – cover artwork, adapted from "Swamp Demon" by Frank Frazetta
Brian Bamps – Inner sleeve artwork
Eric Bauer – engineering, mixing, production 
Enrique Tena – engineering, mixing, production
Mario Ramirez – engineering
JJ Golden – mastering
Matthew Jones – layout

Charts

References

2019 albums
Oh Sees albums
Castle Face Records albums